Cyperus uncinulatus is a species of sedge that is native to parts of Central America and South America.

See also 
 List of Cyperus species

References 

uncinulatus
Plants described in 1842
Flora of Argentina
Flora of Bolivia
Flora of Colombia
Flora of Mexico
Flora of Paraguay
Flora of Brazil
Flora of Guatemala
Taxa named by Christian Gottfried Daniel Nees von Esenbeck